Marit Elveos (born 4 May 1965, in Steigen) is a Norwegian cross-country skier. She represented the club Bodø & Omegn IL. She competed at the 1988 Winter Olympics in Calgary.

Cross-country skiing results
All results are sourced from the International Ski Federation (FIS).

Olympic Games

World Championships

World Cup

Season standings

Team podiums

 2 podiums

References

External links

1965 births
Living people
People from Steigen
Norwegian female cross-country skiers
Olympic cross-country skiers of Norway
Cross-country skiers at the 1988 Winter Olympics
Sportspeople from Nordland